Melanella martinii, common name the white parasitic snail, is a species of sea snail, a marine gastropod mollusk in the family Eulimidae.

Description
The size of the shell varies between 20 mm and 50 mm.

Distribution
This marine species occurs in the Red Sea; off the Philippines, Vietnam, Taiwan and Australia (Queensland, Western Australia)

References

 Adams, A. 1854. Monographs of the genera Eulima, Niso, Leiostraca, Obeliscus, Pyramidella and Monoptygma. pp. 793–825 in Sowerby, G.B. (ed.). Thesaurus Conchyliorum or monographs of genera of shells. London : Sowerby Vol. 2 pp. 439–899. 
 Smith, E.A. 1884. Mollusca. pp. 34–116, 487-508, 657-659, pls 4-7. In, Report on the Zoological Collections made in the Indo-Pacific Ocean during the voyage of the H.M.S. 'Alert ' 1881-2. London : British Museum Trustees, printed by Taylor & Francis.
 Odhner, N.H. 1917. Results of Dr E. Mjöbergs Swedish scientific expeditions to Australia. 1910-1913, pt XVII, Mollusca. Kongliga Svenska Vetenskaps-Academiens Nya Handlingar, Stockholm 52(16): 1-115 pls 1-3

External links
 

martinii
Gastropods described in 1854